Rose Conway-Walsh (née Conway) is an Irish Sinn Féin politician who has been a Teachta Dála (TD) for the Mayo constituency since the 2020 general election. She previously served as a Leader of Sinn Féin in the Seanad and a Senator for the Agricultural Panel from 2016 to 2020.

Early life
Conway-Walsh grew up in Ballycroy, County Mayo and is one of nine children. She attended primary school in Ballycroy before attending a convent in Belmullet. She moved to London when she was 19. On returning to Ireland, she obtained a Bachelor of Arts in public management and a Master's degree in Local Government from NUI Galway.

Political career
Conway-Walsh is the first Sinn Féin TD to represent County Mayo in almost 100 years; the last Sinn Féin TD to be elected in Mayo was John Madden in June 1927.

She was a member of Mayo County Council from 2009 to 2016. She was an unsuccessful candidate for the Mayo constituency at the 2011 and 2016 general elections. She founded the Sinn Féin Mayo Women's Movement in response to the lack of women in politics. In July 2021 she attracted criticism for comparing segregated reopening after the Covid-19 Pandemic to the segregation of the American South and the struggle of Rosa Parks, for which she later apologised.

She is the party's spokesperson on Higher Education, Innovation, and Science.

Personal life
Conway married Noel Walsh in 2000. They live in Belmullet with their two sons.

References

External links
Rose Conway-Walsh's page on the Sinn Féin website

Living people
Alumni of the University of Galway
Irish republicans
Local councillors in County Mayo
Members of the 25th Seanad
21st-century women members of Seanad Éireann
Members of the 33rd Dáil
21st-century women Teachtaí Dála
Politicians from County Mayo
Sinn Féin senators
Sinn Féin TDs (post-1923)
Year of birth missing (living people)